The Communist Party of Bulgaria (CPB) is a communist party in Bulgaria, currently led by Aleksandar Paunov.

The party was founded in 1996 as the Communist Party. 

Since 2001, it is part of the Coalition for Bulgaria, an alliance led by the Bulgarian Socialist Party. The party publishes the newspaper Rabotnicheski Vestnik. In the 2014 parliamentary election, the Coalition for Bulgaria received 15.4% of the popular vote and 39 out of 240 seats. The party remains represented in Parliament within the coalition after the 2017 election.

The party came under fire during the 2020 protests, when it was alleged that first secreatary, Aleksandar Paunov, had had a phone call with convicted businessman Vasil Bozhkov.  Alexander Paunov went on to admit that the conversation took place, however denied any wrongdoing.  This led to Alexander Paunov being asked to leave the BSP for Bulgaria parliamentary group, of which he was a part, becoming an independent MP. 

Most recently, the party joined the Neutral Bulgaria coalition with the parties ATAKA, Russophiles for the Revival of the Fatherland and the Party of Bulgarian Communists.

References

External links
 

Political parties established in 1996
Bulgaria, Communist Party of Bulgaria
1996 establishments in Bulgaria
Far-left political parties
International Meeting of Communist and Workers Parties